Jonatan Julien (born 20 March 1972) is a Canadian politician, who was elected to the National Assembly of Quebec in the 2018 provincial election. He represents the electoral district of Charlesbourg as a member of the Coalition Avenir Québec.

Prior to his election in the National Assembly, he was a city councillor in the municipal district of Neufchâtel-Lebourgneuf for the Quebec City Council from 2013 to 2018.

Cabinet posts

References

1972 births
Living people
Coalition Avenir Québec MNAs
Members of the Executive Council of Quebec
Quebec City councillors
21st-century Canadian politicians
Université Laval alumni